Beatrice Gärds (born 10 February 1997) is a Swedish footballer who plays as a midfielder for Elitettan club IK Uppsala.

References

External links 
 
 

1997 births
Living people
Swedish women's footballers
Damallsvenskan players
Women's association football midfielders
Kvarnsvedens IK players